The 2017 Blind World T20 also known as 2017 Blind T20 World Cup was a T20I tournament which was also the second edition of the Blind T20 World Cup for blind cricketers, held in India from 30 January to 12 February. India defeated Pakistan by 9 wickets in the finals to win their second Blind T20 World Cup. Ten teams, hosts India, Pakistan, Sri Lanka, England, Bangladesh, West Indies, South Africa, Nepal, Australia and New Zealand took part, playing in 48 matches.

Hosting the T20 World Cup for the Blind for the second time after the inaugural edition in 2012, India were the defending champions and were the favourites to win the title.

The final of this tournament was held in M. Chinnaswamy Stadium, Bangaluru between arch rivals India and Pakistan and it was a high scoring match. Pakistan batted first and scored 197/8 in their entire 20 overs and in reply India lost only one wicket and chased the mammoth total of 198.

Format 
In the group stage, each team had to play against all the other teams which were competing for the title. Following this the teams finishing in top four progressed to the semi finals.

Venues 
More than twenty stadiums hosted the matches.

Delhi IIT Ground, Sardar Vallabhbai Stadium, Feroz Shah Kotla Ground, Delhi Dwaraka DDA Ground, Delhi Siri Fort, Nahar Singh Stadium of Faridabad, Delhi Saket DDA Ground, Holkar Stadium, Bandra Kurla Complex Ground, MIG Cricket Club, Bandra (East), Brabourne Stadium, Pune PYC Ground, Rajagiri College Ground – Cochin, Karnataka State Cricket Association Ground, Alur., KIIT Stadium, Bhubaneswar, Rural Development Trust Stadium, Anatapur, Mulapadu cricket Ground (Gokaraju Liala Gangaaraju ACA Cricket Ground), Lal Bahadur Shastri Stadium and M. Chinnaswamy Stadium were some of the stadiums which were given the permission to host the 2017 Blind T20 World Cup matches.

Group stage 
A total of 48 matches were played between the 10 teams.

Round 1

1st Match

2nd Match

Round 2

3rd Match

4th Match

5th Match

6th Match

7th Match

Round 3

8th Match

9th Match

10th Match

11th Match

12th Match

Round 4

13th Match

14th Match

15th Match

16th Match

17th Match

Round 5

18th Match

19th Match

20th Match

21st Match

22nd Match

Round 6

23rd Match

24th Match

25th Match

26th Match

Semifinals

Semifinal 1

Semifinal 2

Final

See also 
Blind cricket

References 

 
Blind cricket
2017 in Indian cricket
Parasports in India